Cyber ranges are virtual environments used for cybersecurity, cyberwarfare training, simulation or emulation and development of technologies related to cybersecurity. Their scale can vary drastically, from just a single node to an internet-like network.

See also
 
 National Cyber Range

References 

Computer security
Computer network security